Harvey Cirque is a cirque containing a small glacier between Scheuermann Spur and Corell Cirque in the southern part of the Darwin Mountains of Antarctica. The cirque occurs along the extensive Prebble Icefalls which contribute some ice to the head of the cirque; there is limited flow from the cirque to Hatherton Glacier. It was named after geologist Ralph P. Harvey of Case Western Reserve University, Cleveland, Ohio, who was engaged in the United States Antarctic Program Antarctic Search for Meteorites (ANSMET) in the Transantarctic Mountains for many austral summers, 1992–2001, ultimately as ANSMET principal investigator.

References

Cirques of Antarctica
Landforms of Oates Land